The 2018 Breeders' Cup Challenge series provided winners of the designated races an automatic "Win and You're In" Berth in the 2018 Breeders' Cup, held on November 2 and 3. The Breeders' Cup also pays the entry fee and provides a travel allowance for the connections of the challenge race winners. Races were chosen by the Breeders' Cup organization and included key races in the various Breeders' Cup divisions from around the world.

Summary
On April 18, 2018, the Breeders' Cup announced the 2018 Breeders' Cup Challenge series races. The main change was the addition of four "win and you're in" races from Royal Ascot: the Queen Anne Stakes provides a berth in the Mile division; the Prince of Wales's Stakes (G1) in the Turf; the Norfolk Stakes in the new Juvenile Turf Sprint; and the Diamond Jubilee Stakes in the Turf Sprint. The Jaipur Invitational was also added as a qualifier for the Turf Sprint. The following races were removed from the series: the TJ Smith (Turf Sprint), the Smile Sprint (Sprint), the T. Von Zastrow Stutenpreis (Filly & Mare Turf) and the Grosser Preis von Baden (Turf). On June 25, three more races were added to the challenge series as qualifiers for the Juvenile Turf Sprint. These were the Futurity at Belmont Park, the Indian Summer Stakes at Keeneland and a new race at Santa Anita, subsequently named the Speakeasy Stakes.

A record 221 pre-entries were taken on October 24. Twelve races, including the Classic, were over-subscribed, meaning more than 14 horses (12 in the Juvenile Turf Sprint) wished to enter. Forty-eight of the pre-entries were automatic qualifiers through the Challenge series.

The following automatic qualifiers also won their division of the Breeders' Cup:
 Sistercharlie automatically qualified by winning the Beverley D and went on to win the Filly & Mare Turf
 Accelerate, winner of the Classic, automatically qualified by winning both the Pacific Classic and Awesome Again
 Game Winner qualified by winning the FrontRunner, then won the Juvenile
 Roy H won the Santa Anita Sprint Championship before winning the Sprint
 Jaywalk won both the Frizette and Juvenile Fillies

Automatic Qualifiers
The winners of the 2018 Breeders' Cup Challenge races are shown below. The status column shows whether the horse was subsequently entered in the corresponding Breeders' Cup division and if so, if they won. The status column also shows a few horses that had been sidelined by injury or retired prior to the running of the Breeders' Cup.

See also

2018 British Champions Series

References

Breeders' Cup Challenge
Breeders' Cup Challenge series
Breeders' Cup